Minister of Information Technology or simply Minister of IT, officially known as Minister of Information Technology, Electronics & Communications.  The current Minister of IT for the state of Andhra Pradesh is Gudivada Amarnath.

List of Ministers

References 

Government of Andhra Pradesh